"Feels Just Like It Should" is a song co-written and recorded by American country music artist Pat Green.  It was released in May 2006 as the lead-off single from his album Cannonball.  The song peaked at number 13 on the Billboard Hot Country Songs chart, becoming his biggest hit since 2003's "Wave on Wave".  It was written by Green, Brett James and Justin Pollard.

Content
The narrator talks about how in this moment with his significant other, everything "feels just like it should".

Chart performance 
"Feels Just Like It Should" debuted at number 32 on the U.S. Billboard Hot Country Songs for the week of May 27, 2006.

Year-end charts

References 

2006 singles
2006 songs
Pat Green songs
Song recordings produced by Don Gehman
Songs written by Brett James
BNA Records singles
Music videos directed by Trey Fanjoy
Songs written by Pat Green